The IFC Media Project is an American television series, which airs on the Independent Film Channel (IFC) in the United States.

The show is a documentary series which examines America's news media and seeks to uncover the truth about the news. In its first two seasons it was hosted by award winning journalist Gideon Yago and featured in-depth reporting on controversial topics facing today's media through its use of interviews and documentary footage.

In the third season, the show dropped its "magazine-style" format and focused each episode on telling 22-minute short documentaries under the tagline "4 Nights, 4 Journalists, 4 Stories." The third season follows journalists Max Blumenthal, Nir Rosen, Charlie LeDuff and Andrew Berends.

The series is filmed at various locations and is produced by Meghan O'Hara and Nick McKinney.

Episodes

Season 3 (2010)

Season 2 (2009)

Season 1 (2008)

Featured

Max Blumenthal
Nir Rosen
Charlie LeDuff
Andrew Berends
Gideon Yago

Guest stars

Robb Wood
Cliff Kincaid
Allan Block
Radmilla Suleymanova
Rome Hartman
Randy Cohen
Mark LeVine
Tucker Carlson
Benjamin Lowy
Jimmy Tingle
Valerie Plame
Carl Marci
Dan Rather
Tim Wilson
Arianna Huffington
Frank Luntz
Richard Mack
Dick Armey
Matt Taibbi
Rodgin Cohen

References

External links
 Show website
 Imdb article

2000s American documentary television series
2010s American documentary television series
2008 American television series debuts
IFC (American TV channel) original programming